Longton Transport Interchange serves the town of Longton, Staffordshire, England. The interchange is adjacent to Longton railway station.

The interchange was opened in 2003 at a cost of £637,000. The building was part funded by Stoke-on-Trent City Council, with £140,000 of funding being paid by Tesco. Tesco's contribution was part of the conditions put in place when the council approved planning permission for a supermarket in the town centre.

The main operators at the station are First Potteries, Wardle Transport, Copeland Tours and D&G Bus & Coach. Buses run from the bus station around the Potteries area and as far as Alton Towers.

References

External links
Disabled Go - Longton Transport Interchange Access Guide

Bus stations in England
Transport in Stoke-on-Trent
Buildings and structures in Stoke-on-Trent